Michel Lopez (born November 3, 1972) is an Aruban footballer. He has played for the Aruba national team.

References

1972 births
Living people
Aruban footballers
Aruba international footballers
Association football midfielders
SV Dakota players